The Ybor Channel is one of several channels for boat traffic in and around the Port of Tampa in Tampa, Florida.

Geography of Tampa, Florida
Channels of the United States
Tampa Bay